Dryden, originally known as New Prospect, is the second-largest city in the Kenora District of Northwestern Ontario, Canada, located on Wabigoon Lake. It is the least populous community in Ontario incorporated as a city. The City of Dryden had a population of 7,749 and its population centre (urban area) had a population of 5,586 in 2016.

Dryden was incorporated as a town in 1910 and as a city in 1998. The main industries in Dryden include manufacturing (particularly paper and pulp), renewable energy (including bioenergy and solar energy), and service. Dryden is located on Ontario's Highway 17, which forms part of the Trans-Canada Highway. It is situated halfway between the larger cities of Winnipeg and Thunder Bay.

History

Before settlement by Europeans, the Dryden area was inhabited by the Anishinaabe. They used the shore by the Wabigoon River as a camping site, calling it Paawidigong ("the place of rapids" in Ojibwe). The settlement was founded as an agricultural community by John Dryden,  Ontario's Minister of Agriculture in 1895. While his train was stopped at what was then known as Barclay Tank to re-water, he noticed clover growing and decided to found an experimental farm the following year. The farm's success brought settlers from southern Ontario and the community came to be known as New Prospect. In 1886, gold was discovered near the area, also attracting people. In 1897, the community was renamed to Dryden to honor the minister of agriculture. It incorporated as a town in 1910 and as a city in 1998 after merging with the neighbouring township of Barclay.

One of the earliest industries in the area was pulp and paper. A paper mill was built in the town in 1910 because of the abundance of wood suitable for kraft pulping as well as energy from the Wabigoon River. The town came into national consciousness because of mercury contamination. In the 1970s, it became known that the Dryden pulp and paper operations discharged ten tons of mercury directly into the Wabagoon River over a span of eight years. The mercury caused persistent environmental damage, poisoned river systems and lakes, and led to members of the Grassy Narrows community suffering severe mercury poisoning known as Minamata disease.

The town was also the site of the March 10, 1989 crash of Air Ontario Flight 1363 from Thunder Bay to Winnipeg, which killed 24 people.

Geography and climate 

Dryden is located on the Wabigoon River and Wabigoon Lake in northwestern Ontario. It borders Thunder Lake and Aaron Provincial Park on the east, and the smaller Milanese's Lakes are also located within the city. Dryden is located 340 kilometres (210 miles) northwest of Thunder Bay. Nearby communities include Wabigoon, Vermilion Bay, Kenora, and Sioux Lookout. Dryden is also near the Eagle Lake First Nation.

Along with most of the rest of Ontario west of 90° West, Dryden is in the Central Time Zone and observes daylight saving time.

Dryden experiences a humid continental climate (Dfb) with short, warm summers, and long, cold winters. Compared to the rest of the province, the annual temperature range is wider and precipitation is more concentrated in the summer.

Demographics

The population centre, or urban area, of Dryden had a population of 5,586 in the 2016 census, a 0.9% increase from 2011. The median value of dwellings in the urban area is CA$150,505, significantly lower than the national median of $341,556. The median household income (after-tax) in Dryden is $58,624, almost on par with the national average at $61,348.

The city's population peaked at 8,198 measured in the 2001 Canadian Census and is slowly declining due to lack of support for an aging population and high taxes. 21% of the population was 65 years and over as of the 2016 census compared to 16.7% in the entirely of Ontario. The median age of 46.2 was nearly 5 years older than the provincial median of 41.3.

In 2016, approximately 1,465 residents (19.3%) considered themselves to have an Aboriginal identity. 220 residents (2.9%) belonged to a visible minority group (i.e. people who are not Aboriginal and "non-Caucasian in race or non-white in colour"). The largest group was Filipino, representing about 80 residents (1% of the population).

In the 2011 National Household Survey, 4,970 residents (66.8% of the respondents) stated that they were Christian, while 2,455 (33.0%) did not affiliate with any religion. 0.1% identified as Buddhist, while a further 0.1% practised traditional Aboriginal spirituality.

Arts and culture

It was built in 1962, out of a metal frame and concrete plaster.

Several annual music concerts are held featuring local musicians. "Come Together" is an annual December 27 or 28th concert, and "Kickin' Country" is a mid April country show. Both featuring local acts. The "Blue Moon Festival" is a daylong event that is held on or near a blue moon calendar event in the summer months.

Dryden is home to a variety of arts groups. "Theatre 17" is a community theatre group under the direction of Judith Hamilton that stages theatrical productions, including Noises Off and Tony and Tina's Wedding. The DRAC (Dryden Regional Arts Council) is an artists group that organizes yearly art tours, art shows and also operates a retail store known as Naked North Art Gallery. The Dryden Community Band is a group of musicians who perform under conductor Ryan Graham.

Government
Dryden is currently part of the provincial electoral district of Kenora—Rainy River. Kenora—Rainy River's Member of Provincial Parliament has been Greg Rickford, a member of the Progressive Conservative Party of Ontario, since 2018. He was preceded by Sarah Campbell and Howard Hampton, both of the New Democratic Party. Federally, the city is part of the Kenora riding, which has been represented by Eric Melillo, a Conservative, since 2019. He was preceded by the Liberal Bob Nault and the aforementioned Greg Rickford.

The city council is composed of six councillors and a mayor. As with the rest of Ontario, municipal elections occur every 4 years. Currently, Dryden's mayor is Greg Wilson, elected 2018. Previous mayors of Dryden have included Craig Nuttall (elected in 2010 and 2014), Anne Krassilowsky (elected in 2002 and 2006), and Roger Valley in the 1990s.

Paper industry

Infrastructure and services

The city is served by Dryden Regional Airport. Currently, Bearskin Airlines operates services from Dryden to various other airports in the area, including Thunder Bay International Airport and Winnipeg James Armstrong Richardson International Airport. The Dryden Water Aerodrome is located within the city limits, on Wabigoon Lake.

Dryden is located on Ontario Highway 17, part of the Trans-Canada Highway, between Winnipeg and Thunder Bay. Several secondary highways pass through or near the city:
 Highway 502, with northern terminus just west of Dryden and southern terminous at Highway 11 near Fort Frances
 Highway 594, with eastern terminus at Dryden, connecting to Eagle River and Highway 17
 Highway 601, providing access to Dryden Regional Airport
 Highway 665, with southern terminus just north of Dryden, linking to Richan

The Dryden Regional Health Centre is a small hospital in Dryden, founded in 1952. It employs 300 staff and volunteers.

Dryden is within the jurisdiction of the Keewatin-Patricia District School Board. It is home to Dryden High School, a secondary school, as well as New Prospect Public School and Open Roads Public School, both elementary schools. St. Joseph's School, a catholic school, is also in Dryden. Along with several other Northwest Ontarian communities, Dryden is home to a campus of Confederation College, whose main campus is in Thunder Bay.

The Dryden Fire Service, a volunteer fire department, operates out of two fire stations and responds to about 250 incidents annually. It was established in 1908 with Alex Kennedy as Fire Chief. They also raise public awareness about fire safety. The service comprises five full-time staff and around forty volunteers. The City of Dryden also operates a landfill and recycling facility.

Media 
Dryden is currently served by several radio stations, including:
 92.7 FM - CKDR, adult contemporary
 100.9 FM - CBQH, CBC Radio One, repeats CBQT-FM Thunder Bay
 102.7 FM - CKSB-6, Ici Radio-Canada Première, repeats CKSB-10-FM Winnipeg
 104.5 FM - CKQV-1, classic hits, repeats CKQV-FM Vermilion Bay, brands itself as Q104
Dryden previously had a community newspaper, The Dryden Observer, originally known as the Wabigoon Star, but it stopped publishing in 2019. The mayor of Dryden noted that the newspaper had provided a local sense of identity. CKQV operates an online local news source called DrydenNow, and CKDR also has a news division.

Notable people
Lynn Beyak (born 1949), former Canadian Senator
Molly Bolin (born 1957), former professional basketball player
Wayne Muloin (born 1941), former professional ice hockey player
Patricia O'Callaghan (born 1970), opera singer
Dennis Owchar (born 1953), former professional ice hockey player
Chris Pronger (born 1974), former professional ice hockey player, 2000 Hart Trophy and Norris Trophy winner, 2006-2007 Stanley Cup champion, 2015 Hockey Hall of Fame inductee and brother of Sean Pronger
Sean Pronger (born 1972), former professional ice hockey player
Roger Valley (born 1957), former mayor of Dryden and former member of the House of Commons of Canada

References

External links

 
Cities in Ontario
Single-tier municipalities in Ontario